Nicole Melichar and Demi Schuurs defeated Marie Bouzková and Lucie Hradecká in the final, 6–2, 6–4, to win the doubles tennis title at the 2021 Charleston Open. It marked their third title together as a team. 

Anna-Lena Grönefeld and Alicja Rosolska were the defending champions from when the tournament was last held in 2019. Neither defended their title after Grönefeld retired from professional tennis at the end of 2019 and Rosolska did not return to compete.

Seeds

Draw

Draw

References

External Links
Main Draw

Volvo Car Open - Doubles
2021 Doubles